Andean Spanish is a dialect of Spanish spoken in the central Andes, from southern Colombia, with influence as far south as northern Chile and Northwestern Argentina, passing through Ecuador, Peru, and Bolivia. While similar to other Spanish dialects, Andean Spanish shows influence from Quechua, Aymara, and other indigenous languages, due to prolonged and intense language contact. This influence is especially strong in rural areas.

Phonology

In southern Bolivia and northern Chile, syllable-final /s/ is mostly aspirated.
 As in all American dialects of Spanish, Andean Spanish has  ( is not distinguished from ).
 Especially in the Ecuadorian variant, coda  is often voiced to  before a vowel or before a voiced consonant (including sonorants), but the latter is also a feature of most other Spanish dialects. In the Peruvian variant, it is palatalized before .
 In Bolivia, Ecuador, and southern Peru,  and  do not merge (lack of yeísmo). In northern Ecuador,  tends to be pronounced as a voiced postalveolar fricative. However,  yeísmo is on the rise among Ecuador's middle and upper classes.
This is in decline among the middle and upper classes.
 is velar  rather than glottal .
 is realised as bilabial , sometimes with an epenthetic  following.
Emphasis is given to the consonants but the vowels are weakened, especially for unstressed syllables (like in Mexican Spanish, but not as marked).
The intonation patterns of some Andean accents, such as those of Cusco, have been influenced by those of Quechua. Even monolingual Spanish speakers can show Quechua influence in their intonation.

Syntax and morphology 
Voseo is common in the Bolivian and Ecuadorian Andes, largely among rural and poorer speakers. It is nearly extinct in Peru. Some speakers tend towards pronominal voseo, using  with the  conjugations of verbs, whereas more indigenous speakers tend to use the  conjugations.

They can be stacked at the end of a clause:"Just go ahead and tell him."Andean Spanish also widely uses redundant "double possessives" as in:"I'm going to Maria's house."This also shows how  can indicate "motion towards" in the Andes.  may also be used "before a locative adverb, as in  'I live here' or  'Water is coming out there.'"

Due to Aymara and Quechua influence, Andean Spanish often uses the pluperfect tense or clause-final  "he/she says" to indicate evidentiality. Evidential  is more common in monolingual Peruvian Spanish. 

In upper Ecuador, a  + gerund construction is common, ie:"Pedro fixed my watch."

Vocabulary 
Andean Spanish typically uses more loans from Aymara and Quechua than other Spanish varieties. In addition, some common words have different meanings. , meaning "foot," can refer to the whole leg, due to Aymara influence.  ("always") can mean "still."

Influence on nearby areas
In northwest Argentina and northern Chile today, it is possible to say that there is a certain fusion in the dialects of both countries, but the local dialects are more dominant.

The Andean dialect can be heard in the northwest, with respect to the pronunciation and lexicon. The Rioplatense dialect provides some of the pronunciation, a variety of modes, and the Argentine dialect.

Rioplatense replaces the Andean use of "" as the second person singular familiar pronoun with "". It is very similar in Chile, but "" and "" are there both used as the singular familiar second-person pronoun. Also, there is influence of Chilean Spanish and some Andean Spanish.

References

Bibliography 

 
 
 Escobar, Alberto: Variaciones sociolingüísticas del castellano en el Perú.- Lima 1978.-
 Granda, German: Estudios de lingüística andina.- Lima Pontificia Universidad Católica del Perú, 2001.-
 
 Lapesa, Rafael.: Historia de la lengua española.- Madrid, 1986.-
 Canfield, Delos Lincoln.: La pronunciación del español de América.- Chicago, The University of Chicago, 1981.-
 Mackenzie, Ian: A Linguistic Introduction to Spanish.- University of Newcastle upon Tyne, LINCOM Studies in Romance Linguistics 35.- .

Spanish dialects of South America